Gilliland's Ranch, also known as Gilliland Ranch, Gilliland's ECETI Ranch, and Sattva Sanctuary, is an area of land in Trout Lake, at the base of Mount Adams, in Southwest Washington. The property belongs to James Gilliland, who claims to have established Enlightened Contact with ExtraTerrestrial Intelligence (ECETI) and the Self-Mastery Earth Institute in 1986, and has hosted unidentified flying object (UFO) sighting events since 2003. Gilliland reports frequent UFO sightings and "unexplained light shows" on site. Multiple investigations have shown that the lights that have been seen in the sky are actually mundane objects such as planes and satellites.

References

External links
 

Klickitat County, Washington
Ufology